Lou-Ann Preble (born September 26, 1929) is a former member of the Arizona House of Representatives. She served in the House from January 1993 through January 2001, representing district 9. She could not run for re-election in 2000 due to the amendment to the Arizona Constitution which limited politicians to serving four consecutive terms.

References

Republican Party members of the Arizona House of Representatives
Women state legislators in Arizona
1929 births
Living people